GENSA (General Serviços Aéreos) is an airline is based in Campo Grande, Brazil. It was founded in 1996, and since 2005 it operates flights in code share with Varig and TAM Linhas Aéreas.

Services 

Cities served: Campo Grande, Alta Floresta, Bonito, Cuiabá, Juína, Matupá, Nova Mutum, Rondonópolis, Sapezal, Sinop.

Fleet 

The GENSA fleet consists of the following aircraft (as of August 2016):

The airline previously operated:
2 Embraer EMB 110P1 Bandeirante

External links
GENSA

References 

Airlines of Brazil
Airlines established in 1996